Mbunga is a Bantu language of Tanzania.

References

Kilombero languages
Languages of Tanzania